The Pottawatomie Baptist Mission Building is a historic mission off W 6th Street, one-half mile west of Wanamaker Road in Topeka, Kansas. It was built in 1849 and added to the National Register of Historic Places in 1971.

It served Pottawatomie Native Americans who had been forcibly removed along the Potawatomi Trail of Death in 1847 from the Ohio region to a reservation on the Kansas River west of Topeka.  Baptist missionaries Robert Simerwell and Reverend Johnston Lykins came to the reservation in 1848.

As a school, it was a three-story building made of ashlar stone  in plan, with 12 rooms and 60 windows and doors.

References

Baptist churches in Kansas
Churches on the National Register of Historic Places in Kansas
Churches in Topeka, Kansas
National Register of Historic Places in Topeka, Kansas